Arrienne Wynen is an Australian international female lawn bowler.

Bowls career
Wynen represented Australia in the fours at the 2002 Commonwealth Games.

Wynen won a pairs silver medal with Karen Murphy and fours bronze medal at the 2000 World Outdoor Bowls Championship in Johannesburg, South Africa.

She won double gold at the 2001 Asia Pacific Bowls Championships in Melbourne.

References

Living people
Australian female bowls players
1955 births
Commonwealth Games competitors for Australia
Bowls players at the 2002 Commonwealth Games
21st-century Australian women